Tunnels traversing the Saint-Gotthard Massif in Switzerland:

Gotthard (Rail) Tunnel, 15km railway culmination tunnel (1882)
Gotthard Road Tunnel, 17km motorway tunnel (1980)
Gotthard Base Tunnel, 57km railway lowest-level tunnel (2016)

See also 
Gotthard (disambiguation)